The 3rd Central Bureau of the Chinese Communist Party (Chinese: 中国共产党第三届中央局) was centrally elected by the 3rd Central Executive Committee of the Chinese Communist Party in Guangzhou in June 1923. It was preceded by the 2nd Central Bureau of the Chinese Communist Party.

Members
Chen Duxiu
Cai Hesen
Mao Zedong
Luo Zhanglong
Tan Pingshan, later changed to Wang Hebo

External links
 The Leaders of the 3rd CCP National Congress

Politburo of the Chinese Communist Party
1923 in Asia
1923 in China